Philip Travis (born July 2, 1940 in Fall River, Massachusetts) is an American politician who represented the 4th Bristol District in the Massachusetts House of Representatives from 1983–2007 and served as a member of the Board of Selectmen and School Committee in Rehoboth, Massachusetts. Phil Travis is also a professor at Massasoit Community College

References

1940 births
Democratic Party members of the Massachusetts House of Representatives
People from Rehoboth, Massachusetts
University of Massachusetts Dartmouth alumni
Bryant University alumni
Living people